York Liao, MBE, SBS, JP (born ca. 1948) is a Chinese-born Hong Kong government official and businessman, who is or has been:
 a managing director of Winbridge Company Limited, a private investment and consultancy company
 an Independent Non-Executive Director of Hang Lung Group Ltd (since October 2003)
 a Non-Executive Director of Armitage Technologies Holding Ltd (since February 2002)
 a cofounder (along with Dr C C Chang and Mr James Lee) of Varitronix International Ltd in 1978, one of the first manufacturers of LCD.

Affiliations
 City Polytechnic (now City University) Council 
 University of Science and Technology Council
 University Grants Committee (the overseeing body appointed by the government for the funding of tertiary education in Hong Kong) 
 Industrial and Technology Development Council 
 Hong Kong Industrial Technology Center, government-sponsored incubation center
 California Institute of Technology ("Caltech") Board of Trustees (since 1998)

Education
Born in China and raised in Hong Kong, Liao came to the United States to attend Caltech, where he earned a BS in physics in 1967. He continued his studies in applied physics at Harvard University, and was awarded an MA (1968) and a Ph.D. (1973).

Personal life
York Liao is married and has three children. His sister is Dr. Sarah Liao.

References

1940s births
Harvard University alumni
California Institute of Technology alumni
Government officials of Hong Kong
Recipients of the Silver Bauhinia Star
Members of the Order of the British Empire
Hong Kong businesspeople
Living people
Place of birth missing (living people)
Date of birth missing (living people)